"Funky Child" is the second single released from the Lords of the Underground's debut album, Here Come the Lords. Produced and mixed by the duo of Marley Marl and K-Def, "Funky Child" was a success for the group, making it to five different Billboard charts, including 74 on the Billboard Hot 100 and 2 on the Hot Rap Singles, where it found the most success.

Single track listing

A-Side
"Funky Child" (Extended Mix)- 4:31  
"Funky Child" (Instrumental Mix)- 4:29

B-Side
"Funky Child" (Underground Mix)- 4:29  
"Funky Child" (7" Mix)- 3:57

Charts

1992 songs
1993 singles
Lords of the Underground songs
Elektra Records singles